Trilochana scolioides is a moth of the family Sesiidae. It is found in India (Darjeeling), Thailand and Vietnam.

References

Moths described in 1879
Sesiidae